The Dublin Association Football Club was an association football club based in Dublin, Ireland. Dublin Association was the first football club to be formed in Dublin and the first club outside of Ulster to be affiliated with the Irish Football Association. They existed between 1883 and 1890 and played in the Irish Cup.

Dublin Association was formed at Tyrone Place (now Cathedral Street) in November 1883. Initially, the team had little in the way of competition, with only 12 men turning up for their first game, however a month later, students from Trinity College would form a rival club called Dublin University A.F.C. The first-ever "Dublin Derby" was played at College Park on 7 November 1883 when Association met and defeated the university, 4–0. Association's goals were scored by W. Butler (2), H.J. Hamilton and C. Clegg. The club first entered the Irish Cup in the 1883–84 season. By 1884, there were five teams in the city, including a Scottish infantry battalion side. Both Dublin Association and Dublin University would enter the Irish Cup that year, but were eliminated early against better organised sides from Ulster.

The club would only last for seven years. They folded in 1890 due to controversy surrounding their Irish Cup semi-final tie with Cliftonville. After suffering a 3–2 defeat, Association claimed that a match official was connected with Cliftonville and complained to the IFA. A replayed match resulted in the same controversy and the same claims. After the IFA to replay or terminate the tie, Association pulled out of the competition and folded as a club. Following this, a number of Dublin Association members would go on to form a new club called the Leinster Nomads.

Notable former players
Brothers Willoughby and William Hamilton were the first and only two Dublin Association players to represent Ireland when they played against Wales on 11 April 1885. The match, the last to be played as part of the  1884–85 British Home Championship ended with a 2–8 loss to the Welsh in Belfast.

References

Association football clubs in Dublin (city)
Association football clubs established in 1883
1883 establishments in Ireland
Association football clubs in Ireland